The men's trap event at the 2008 Summer Olympics took place on August 9 and 10 at the Beijing Shooting Range Clay Target Field. There were 35 competitors from 25 nations, with each nation having up to two shooters. The Czech Republic won its second shooting gold in two days through David Kostelecký, shooting a perfect 25 in the final round and establishing an Olympic record of 146 hits total after a 2005 rule change. It was the Czech Republic's first medal in the men's trap (though two men from what is now the Czech Republic won medals competing for Czechoslovakia). Giovanni Pellielo of Italy repeated as the silver medalist; in addition to his 2000 bronze, this made Pellielo the first (and, as of the 2016 Games, still the only) man to earn at least three medals in the event; he would go on to win a fourth (another silver) in 2016. Defending Olympic champion Aleksei Alipov of Russia took bronze this year, making him the fifth man to earn two medals in the trap.

Background

This was the 20th appearance of the men's ISSF Olympic trap event. The event was held at every Summer Olympics from 1896 to 1924 (except 1904, when no shooting events were held) and from 1952 to 2016; it was open to women from 1968 to 1992.

Four of the 6 finalists from the 2004 Games returned: gold medalist Alexey Alipov of Russia, silver medalist (and 2000 bronze medalist) Giovanni Pellielo of Italy, fourth-place finisher Ahmed Al-Maktoum of the United Arab Emirates, and fifth-place finisher (and 1996 bronze medalist) Lance Bade of the United States. Two-time (1996 and 2000) gold medalist Michael Diamond of Australia, who had finished 8th in 2004 and missed the cut for the finals, also returned; so did 2000 finalist David Kostelecký, who had not competed in 2004. Diamond was the reigning World Champion again, having won in 2007 (as well as 1999 and 2001). He was favoured once again. Another World Champion (Manavjit Singh Sandhu of India, 2006) was competing in 2008.

For the first time since 1920, no nations made their debut in the event. France made its 18th appearance, matching the absent Great Britain for most among nations.

Qualification

Each National Olympic Committee (NOC) could enter up to two shooters if the NOC earned enough quota sports or had enough crossover-qualified shooters. To compete, a shooter needed a quota spot and to achieve a Minimum Qualification Score (MQS). Once a shooter was using a quota spot in any shooting event, they could enter any other shooting event for which they had achieved the MQS as well (a crossover qualification). There were 32 quota spots available for the trap event: 1 for the host nation, 1 at the 2005 World Championship, 5 at the 2002 World Cup events, 3 at the 2006 World Championship, 4 at the 2007 World Cup events, 1 at the 2007 African Championships, 4 at the 2007 European Championships, 2 at the 2007 Pan American Games, 1 at the 2007 World Championship, 3 at the 2007 Asian Championships, 1 at the 2007 Oceania Championships, and 2 invitational places. There were three places used in exchanges, reallocation, and crossover.

Competition format

The competition used the two-round 125+25 format introduced in 1996. A small but significant change had been introduced by a 2005 rules change, however; only one shot per target was allowed in the final round (rather than the two still used in qualifying and previously used in the final).

The event consisted of two rounds: a qualifier and a final. In the qualifier, each shooter fired 5 sets of 25 targets in trap shooting, with 10 targets being thrown to the left, 10 to the right, and 5 straight-away in each set. The shooters could take two shots at each target.

The top 6 shooters in the qualifying round moved on to the final round. There, they fired one additional round of 25 targets, where only one shot could be taken at each target. The total score from all 150 targets was used to determine final ranking. Ties were broken using a shoot-off; additional shots are fired one at a time until there is no longer a tie.

Records

Prior to this competition, the existing world and Olympic records were as follows. There was no final-round Olympic record due to the rule change limiting competitors to one shot per target in the final round.

David Kostelecký set the initial Olympic record for the new final total, hitting 146 targets.

Schedule

All times are China Standard Time (UTC+8)

Results

Qualifying round

The qualifying round was held between 09:00 and 13:30 China Standard Time (UTC+8) on Saturday (first three rounds) and between 09:00 and 12:00 on Sunday (last two rounds).

Final

The final was held at 15:00 China Standard Time (UTC+8) on Sunday.

References

Shooting at the 2008 Summer Olympics
Trap at the Olympics
Men's events at the 2008 Summer Olympics